Mahmoud Namjoo (September 22, 1918 – January 21, 1989) was an Iranian bantamweight weightlifter. He competed at the 1948, 1952 and 1956 Olympics and placed fifth, second and third, respectively. At the world championships he won three gold, one silver and two bronze medals between 1949 and 1957, becoming the first Iranian weightlifter to win a world title. Namjoo was also the first Asian weightlifter to set a world record; during his career he set four: one in clean and jerk in 1949 and three in the total, in 1948, 1949 and 1951.

Namjoo was born in Rasht in 1918 and in 1937 moved to Tehran, where he worked at a carpentry workshop. He took weightlifting in a gym nearby. Besides weightlifting he also competed in bodybuilding, and won the Mr. Universe title in his weight division in 1948, placing fifth in 1955. In 1956 he spent two months working as a weightlifting coach in Turkey. He continued training in his forties and unsuccessfully tried to qualify for the 1960 Olympics. He died of pancreatic cancer aged 70.

External links

References

1918 births
1990 deaths
World Weightlifting Championships medalists
Iranian male weightlifters
Iranian strength athletes
Iranian bodybuilders
Olympic weightlifters of Iran
Olympic silver medalists for Iran
Olympic bronze medalists for Iran
People from Rasht
Weightlifters at the 1948 Summer Olympics
Weightlifters at the 1952 Summer Olympics
Weightlifters at the 1956 Summer Olympics
Asian Games gold medalists for Iran
Asian Games silver medalists for Iran
Olympic medalists in weightlifting
Asian Games medalists in weightlifting
Weightlifters at the 1951 Asian Games
Weightlifters at the 1958 Asian Games
Medalists at the 1956 Summer Olympics
Medalists at the 1952 Summer Olympics
Medalists at the 1951 Asian Games
Medalists at the 1958 Asian Games